Ashin Chekinda (also known as Dhammadūta Ashin Chekinda) is a Theravada Buddhist monk from Myanmar (Burma). Following the 2021 Myanmar coup d'état, Ashin Chekinda's public profile has increased, due to his close relationship with Min Aung Hlaing. In 2022, he was promoted to acting rector at the International Theravada Buddhist Missionary University in Yangon. He founded the Dhammaduta Chekinda University and is known for his summer school programs that attract Burmese youth.

References 

1958 births
Theravada Buddhist monks
Burmese Theravada Buddhists
Burmese Buddhist monks
Living people
20th-century Buddhist monks
21st-century Buddhist monks
20th-century Burmese people
21st-century Burmese people